Tertiary Sports Western Australia (TSWA) is the Western Australian Inter-University competition. Competing teams represent the five WA universities, Curtin University of Technology, Edith Cowan University, Murdoch University, The University of Notre Dame Australia and The University of Western Australia.

The Universities compete in various sports for competition points towards the overall region, as well as qualification for the Australian University Games.

Results

Sports Results

AFL

Men

Basketball

Men

Women

Hockey

Overall

The "Curtin VC Shield Hockey Classic" is Awarded to the Overall Hockey Winners

Men

Women

References
http://www.unisport.com.au
http://www.tswa.com.au
http://www.tswa.com.au/__data/page/4373/Record_of_all_EIE_Fairest_&_Best_Winners.07.pdf
http://www.tswa.com.au/__data/page/4373/Record_of_ATA_Fairest_&_Best_Winners_FINAL.17.9.10.pdf

Sports competitions in Western Australia
Sport at Australian universities